Paris, the capital of France, has an active LGBT community. In the 1990s, 46% of the country's gay men lived in the city. As of 2004, Paris had 140 LGBT bars, clubs, hotels, restaurants, shops, and other commercial businesses. Florence Tamagne, author of "Paris: 'Resting on its Laurels'?", wrote that there is a "Gaité parisienne"; she added that Paris "competes with Berlin for the title of LGBT capital of Europe, and ranks only second behind New York for the title of LGBT capital of the world." It has France's only gayborhoods that are officially organized.

History

Middle Ages to French Revolution

Paris' reputation as a center for queer life dates back as far as the Middle Ages, according to Michael D. Sibalis, who notes a twelfth-century poet's description of the city as full of "the vice of Sodom".
Throughout the Middle Ages however, poor Parisian artisans were regularly convicted and sometimes executed for engaging in sodomy and other same-sex activities.  Historian Maurice Lever notes that by the eighteenth century,  various subcultures had developed into a  "homosexual world" in Paris, "with its own language, rules, codes, rivalries and clans."  There is also historical evidence that lesbian relationships occurred among aristocratic women of that century, as well as lesbian subcultures among the city's prostitutes.

Among the 17th century male aristocracy, Philippe I, Duke of Orléans and Louis Joseph de Bourbon, Duke of Vendôme were known to have relationships with men. Gay writers Henri-Lambert de Thibouville and Charles, marquis de Villette were both friends of Voltaire.
Mlle Raucourt,  was a popular 18th-century actress until her affairs with women scandalized Paris and her career took a nosedive.

A gay couple, Jean Diot and Bruno Lenoir, that were burned to death in front of the Hotel de Ville in 1750 for being gay are memorialized with a stone that has been laid at the intersection of Rue Montorgueil and Rue Bachaumont, where the two were caught by police.

French diplomat and spy Chevalier d'Éon appeared publicly as a man for 49 years, while successfully infiltrating the court of Empress Elizabeth of Russia by presenting as a woman. For 33 years, from 1777 on,  d'Éon dressed as a woman, identifying as female. The character of Chevalier d'Éon is popularized in Europe by the song Sans contrefaçon by French rockstar Mylène Farmer, referring also to the popular gay-icon Eva Kotchever, whose nickname was Queen of the 3rd sex, dressed as a man in New York at Eve's Hangout and in Paris at Le Dôme Café before World War II and was assassinated at Auschwitz;

French Revolution to World War II

The French Revolution decriminalized sodomy in 1791 and as a result increasingly robust queer cultures began to emerge in Paris in the late 18th and 19th centuries. They were allowed to continue on condition that they remain private and discreet.  The booming economic expansion of the Belle Époque during the late nineteenth and early twentieth centuries brought Paris a reputation as the bohemian and erotic capital of the West, which allowed queer cultures in Paris to flourish.  A network of still relatively underground venues for LGBT people emerged, including, salons, bars, cafes and bathhouses, particularly in the Montmartre and Les Halles. Gay men would also meet in the gardens by the Carrousel du Louvre, along the Champs Elysées, by the Bourse, and elsewhere.

Lesbians and bisexual women in particular saw increased visibility during this period, both in the public sphere and in representations in art and literature. Fin de siècle  society in Paris included bars, restaurants and cafes frequented and owned by lesbians, such as Le Hanneton and le Rat Mort.  Private salons in the early 20th century,  like the ones hosted by the American expatriates Nathalie Barney, and Gertrude Stein drew LGBT and heterosexual artists and writers of the era, including Romaine Brooks, Renée Vivien, Colette, Djuna Barnes, André Gide, Pierre Louÿs, Truman Capote,  and Radclyffe Hall. One of Barney's lovers, the courtesan Liane de Pougy, published a best-selling novel based on their romance called l’Idylle Saphique (1901). Many of the more visible lesbians and bisexual women were entertainers and actresses. Some, like the writer Colette and her lover Mathilde de Morny, performed lesbian theatrical scenes in Paris cabarets that drew outrage and censorship.  Descriptions of lesbian salons, cafes and restaurants were included in tourist guides and journalism of the era, as well as mention of houses of prostitution that were uniquely for lesbians. Toulouse Lautrec portrayed Parisian lesbian and bisexual entertainers in many of his paintings, such as dancers Louise Weber, Jane Avril and May Milton, and the clown Cha-U-Kao 

Tamagne stated that beginning in the 19th century Paris became known as a centre for LGBT culture. Foreign expats continued to be drawn to the more open society that existed in Paris. Oscar Wilde spent his last years in a hotel in Paris, where he befriended French author André Gide, who wrote openly about his own homosexuality. Celebrated French poet Paul Verlaine, who had had an intense relationship with poet Arthur Rimbaud, could be seen drinking absinthe in late 19th century Parisian cafes in his final years. Writer and artist Jean Cocteau, who drew inspiration from his many relationships with men,  was an important member of the intellectual and artistic society of Paris in the early 20th century.  Writer Marcel Proust has been described as homosexual by his biographers, but denied it during his lifetime, although his books often dealt with gay themes and characters.

Gay nightlife and drag balls flourished during the jazz age of the 1920s, with Le Monocle being a popular spot for women in tuxedos and Clair de Lune, Chez Ma Cousine, La Petite Chaumiere, and other clubs drawing men in male and female attire.  Tamagne wrote that during the early 20th century Paris was seen as a "queer" capital, even though Amsterdam, Berlin, and London all had more meeting places and organizations than Paris; this was due to the "flamboyance" of LGBT quarters and "visibility" of LGBT celebrities.  When the Nazis cracked down on Berlin in the 1930s, Paris became an even more important center for LGBT life. Tamagne stated that in the 1930s the LGBT populations socialized with migrant groups, some youth groups, criminal groups, and other groups who were "marginalized" in society.

World War II to present

During the Nazi occupation of France during World War II, the French government raised the age of sexual consent from 13 to 15 for heterosexuals, and to 21 for homosexuals. Penalties for the 'unnatural' practice of homosexual acts with minors were a fine and a prison term of six months to three years.  This homosexual consent law was kept in place after the war, lowered to 18 in 1974 and to 15 in 1982.

According to Tamagne, Paris retained the LGBT capital image after the end of World War II. In the 1940s, Jean Genet, a vagabond, prostitute and petty criminal, published five autobiographical novels that were explicit in their depictions of homosexuality and criminality,  and were celebrated by Cocteau, Jean-Paul Sartre, Picasso and others in the Parisian literary scene. Foreign LGBT artists and writers continued to seek the relative tolerance of France's capital city; James Baldwin's 1956 novel about homosexuality, Giovanni's Room, was based on time he had spent in Paris.

In the 1950s and 1960s the police and authorities tolerated homosexuals as long as the conduct was private and out of view.  The Arcadie Association, the first homophile organization in France, and a magazine by the same name, was established in Paris in 1954 by André Baudry, with assistance from Jean Cocteau and Roger Peyrefitte  As a result, Baudry was prosecuted and fined for 'indecent morals' in 1955.  In 1960, an indecent exposure law was introduced which caused more police harassment of gay men and women. In the 1960s, gay males received more harassment from police than lesbians. Between the years of 1953 and 1978 the annual numbers of women convicted of homosexuality ranged between one and twelve. Tamagne characterized this number as "relatively low". Drag performances used male-to-female transsexuals because the police did not allow cisgender males to perform in drag. Gay bar raids occurred during the 1950s and 1960s; there were occasions when the owners of the bars were involved in facilitating the raids. Many lesbians did not visit gay bars and instead socialized in circles of friends. Lesbians who did go to bars often originated from the working class; other women sometimes had internalized self-loathing and/or did not want to damage their reputations.  Chez Moune, opened in 1936,  and New Moon were 20th century lesbian cabarets located in Place Pigalle;  both of them converted to mixed music clubs in the 21st century.

Following the student and worker uprisings of May, 1968, and the rise of feminism, some Parisian LGBT residents became more radicalized in their approach, resulting in the 1971 creation of the Front homosexuel d'action révolutionnaire (Homosexual Revolutionary Action Front). Historian Julian Jackson defined the creation of this group as the "Stonewall" of French LGBT history, when activists developed a view of the world "In opposition to what had gone on before."  Some lesbians, including author Monique Wittig, eventually broke away from Le Front to form Les Gouines Rouges, the Red Dykes.

By the 1970s police files on gays and lesbians were destroyed, and many laws against LGBT conduct and people were repealed.

The rise of AIDS  brought another wave of French LGBT activism to Paris in the late 1980s and early 90s,  though historians have noted that traditional French universalism has sometimes conflicted with American style "identity politics" in French LGBT political movements.

When marriage was legalized for French LGBT couples in 2013, it was met with hostility by some Parisians.  An anti-gay marriage demonstration occurred in the Esplanade des Invalides that same year. However, 2013 polls have indicated that a majority of the French support same-sex marriage and another poll indicated that 77% of the French viewed that homosexuality should be accepted by society, one of the highest in the world.

Geography
Le Marais, where areas are officially named in memory of LGBT leaders and events such as Harvey Milk Square, Mark Ashton Garden or Stonewall Riots Square, is the current gayborhood of Paris but in the early 20th century, Montmartre and Pigalle were meeting places of the LGBT community. Pigalle was also where Chez Moune, the "longest-running lesbian bar and cabaret in Paris", opened in 1937.

By the 1950s the meeting place shifted to Saint-Germain-des-Prés. For gay men, the Rue St. Anne was popular in the 1960s and 70s.

Economy

LGBT businesses in Paris include bars, clubs, restaurants, and shops. Stéphane Leroy stated that 70% of these businesses are in arrondissements one through four. Of the businesses in all of Paris, 40% are in Le Marais.

Frommer's described  in the 4th arrondissement, which carries materials in French and English, as "Paris's largest, best-stocked gay bookstore".

Media
The lesbian magazine La Dixième Muse and the gay male magazines Têtu and Préf are in Paris. These three magazines include English texts.

Politics

Tamagne wrote that Paris "is not the trendiest LGBT city" and "cannot compare with cities like San Francisco, New York or Sydney, or even its nearer former rivals London and Berlin" in regards to nightlife and LGBT activism.

In October 1966 Coutrot, a socialist counselor, criticized LGBT persons for being open with their sexuality, stating that this was "shocking" the "honest citizens" and damaging Paris's international image, "notably regarding the tourists." In May of the following year Edouard Frédéric-Dupont, a conservative councillor, requested that the police increase levels of surveillance in an area bounded by boulevard Raspail and Saint-Germain-de-Pres square. The police complied with his request and arrests resulted.

In 2002, Socialist Bertrand Delanoë became the first openly gay man to be elected mayor of Paris. He was stabbed the same year during the Nuit Blanche, a night of festivities in Paris, while mingling with the public. His assailant told police that "he hated politicians, the Socialist Party, and homosexuals."

Recreation
Paris Pride or La Marche des Fiértes LGBT de Paris is the gay pride parade in Paris.

Religion

In 2012 Ludovic-Mohamed Zahed, who originated from Algeria, stated that he wished to open a mosque in Paris that was LGBT friendly. He planned to open the mosque in an undisclosed Buddhist temple in the east side of Paris. The mosque opened in 2012. This mosque also aimed to welcome transgender and transsexual individuals. The director of the Grand Mosque of Paris, Dalil Boubakeur, stated that it is not possible to have an LGBT-friendly mosque that follows the rules of Islam.

LGBT-affirming churches in Paris that perform same-sex marriages include the American Cathedral and the United Protestant Church of France. Additionally, the Church of St. Eustache is known for its openness towards LGBT people.

Notable residents

17th century

 Philippe I, Duke of Orléans
 Louis Joseph de Bourbon, Duke of Vendôme

18th century

 Henri-Lambert de Thibouville, writer,  wit and correspondent to Voltaire
 Mlle Raucourt,  actress who scandalized Paris with her affairs with women
 Chevalier d'Éon, transgender diplomat and spy
 Charles, marquis de Villette, writer, politician, revolutionary, friend of Voltaire

19th century

 Liane de Pougy, 19th century writer and courtesan
 Paul Verlaine, 19th century poet
 Oscar Wilde, 19th century English writer, spent his last days at the Hotel d'Alsace.

20th century

 Berenice Abbott, photographer
 Azzedine Alaïa, fashion designer
 Marie-Thérèse Auffray, painter and member of the French resistance
 Natalie Barney, expatriate writer, held a salon at 20 Rue Jacob.
 Josephine Baker, 1920s American jazz singer, became a French citizen
 James Baldwin, American author whose novel Giovanni's Room is set in Paris
 Djuna Barnes, American writer who lived in Paris in the 1920s
 Roland Barthes, philosopher
 André Baudry, seminarian, philosophy professor, homophile activist
 Sylvia Beach, owner of the bookstore Shakespeare and Co, and publisher of Ulysses
 Paul Bowles, writer
 Louise Catherine Breslau, painter, and her partner Madeleine Zillhardt, writer
 Romaine Brooks, painter
 Bernard Buffet, painter
 Simone de Beauvoir, writer, feminist and scholar, partner of Jean-Paul Sartre
 Claude Cahun and Marcel Moore, artists and members of the French resistance
 Marcel Carné, filmmaker
 Jean Cocteau writer and artist
 Jean-Pierre Coffe, television presenter
 Colette, novelist
 Coccinelle, actress and cabaret artist
 Françoise d'Eaubonne, activist and writer
 Fabrice Emaer, nightclub impresario, known as "Prince of the Night"
 Michel Foucault, philosopher
 Loie Fuller, actress and dancer
 Jean-Paul Gaultier, fashion designer
 Jean Genet, 20th century writer, prisoner, and activist
 Allen Ginsberg Beat generation poet who shared a hotel in the Left Bank with other poets in the 1950s
 André Gide, writer
 Hervé Guibert, writer and photographer
 Reynaldo Hahn, composer, lover of Marcel Proust
 Bernard-Marie Koltès, dramatist
 Eva Kotchever, owner of the Eve's Hangout in New York, whose refuge was Paris before her murder at Auschwitz.
 Violette Leduc, author whose work was censored in the 1950s because of explicit lesbian passages
 Françoise Mallet-Joris, writer
 Adrienne Monnier, editor and writer
 Mathilde de Morny, artist, transgender partner of Colette
 Michou, cabaret artist and entertainer
 Charles de Noailles, nobleman whose wife replied when asked if he liked men or women, "He likes flowers."
 Madeleine Pelletier, feminist, physician and psychiatrist
 Roger Peyrefitte, 20th century writer and activist who was once called "The Pope of Homosexuals".
 Marcel Proust, writer
 Yves St. Laurent, fashion designer
 Susan Sontag, writer
 Gertrude Stein, writer
 Édith Thomas, novelist, journalist and member of the French resistance
 Alice B. Toklas, partner of Gertrude Stein
 Rose Valland, art historian and member of the French Resistance, captain in the French military,
 Renée Vivien, writer
 Monique Wittig, feminist author
 Hélène van Zuylen, Baroness, international motor racer, lover of Renee Vivien

21st century

 Pierre Bergé, activist, business and life partner of Yves St. Laurent
 Bertrand Delanoë (former Mayor of Paris)
 Caroline Fourest, writer, President of Gay and Lesbian Center
 Énora Malagré, columnist and media presenter
 Ludovic-Mohamed Zahed, imam
 Thierry Schaffauser activist and actor
Guillaume Dustan, writer
Virginie Despentes, writer
Alice Coffin, activist and member of La Barbe

See also

 LGBT rights in France
 LGBT history in France

Notes

References
 Tamagne, Florence. "Paris: 'Resting on its Laurels'?" (Chapter 12). In: Evans, Jennifer V. and Matt Cook. Queer Cities, Queer Cultures: Europe since 1945. Bloomsbury Publishing, August 28, 2014. , 9781441148407. Start p. 240.

Further reading
 Sibalis, Michael. "Urban Space and Homosexuality: The Example of the Marais, Paris' 'Gay Ghetto'" (Wilfrid Laurier University). Urban Studies. August 2004 vol. 41 no. 9 p. 1739-1758. DOI 10.1080/0042098042000243138.

External links

 Gay Paris - City of Paris Convention and Visitors Bureau Official Site
 Interassociative lesbienne, gaie, bi et trans (Inter-LGBT) 
 Têtu  
 Les Mots à la Bouche
 Pref (Archive) 
 La Dixième Muse (Archive) 

Culture of Paris
Paris